Elizabeth Storm (born Elizabeth Jennifer Storm on November 29, 1958) is an American actress.

Storm is perhaps best known for her role as Katherine Barrett on the soap opera Passions from 2000 to 2003. She had the role of Hollis Costillo on the soap opera Santa Barbara in 1989 and Janice Barnes in Days of Our Lives from 1987 to 1988. She has appeared as Janie Peterson on the primetime soap opera Desperate Housewives. She has also guest starred in numerous television series, including CSI: Crime Scene Investigation, Six Feet Under, Without a Trace, The King of Queens, and Matlock.

External links
 

Living people
1958 births
American soap opera actresses
Place of birth missing (living people)
American television actresses
21st-century American women